Group C of the 2014 FIFA World Cup consisted of Colombia, Greece, Ivory Coast, and Japan. Play began on 14 June and ended on 24 June 2014. The top two teams, Colombia and Greece, advanced to the round of 16.

Teams

Notes

Standings

Colombia advanced to play Uruguay (runner-up of Group D) in the round of 16.
Greece advanced to play Costa Rica (winner of Group D) in the round of 16.

Matches

Colombia vs Greece
The two teams had met in one previous match, in a friendly in 1994, where Colombia won 2–0. Colombia midfielder Fredy Guarín was suspended for the match, after being sent off in the team's final qualifier against Paraguay.

Colombia took the lead within five minutes, Juan Cuadrado's cutback was converted by Pablo Armero via a deflection off Greek defender Kostas Manolas. Colombia extended the lead in the second half, when Abel Aguilar flicked on a corner kick from James Rodríguez and Teófilo Gutiérrez scored from close range.
Greece's best chance fell to Theofanis Gekas, who headed against the bar. In stoppage time, Cuadrado set up James to complete the scoring with a low shot.

The 3–0 scoreline was Colombia's biggest win to date in the World Cup.

Ivory Coast vs Japan
The two teams had met in three previous matches, all in friendlies, most recently in 2010.

Japan took the lead in the first half, when Keisuke Honda collected a pass from Yuto Nagatomo after a quick throw-in to strike home with his left foot high into the net.

However, Ivory Coast came back with two goals in two minutes in the second half, first Wilfried Bony headed in from Serge Aurier's cross from the right from six yards, followed by a Gervinho header from six yards from another cross from Aurier on the right.

With his goal, Honda became the first Japanese player to score in two World Cups, and also claimed sole possession of being the top Japanese scorer in World Cup history with three total goals.

Colombia vs Ivory Coast

The two teams had never met before.

After a goalless first half, Colombia scored first when James Rodríguez headed in Juan Cuadrado's corner.
The lead was extended six minutes later when Ivory Coast was caught in possession, and Teófilo Gutiérrez released substitute Juan Quintero to score. Ivory Coast reduced the deficit through Gervinho, who received a pass from Arthur Boka in the left wing, dribbled past three Colombian players and shot home.

The second goal of the tournament by James allowed him to join Bernardo Redín and Adolfo Valencia as the only Colombian players to score more than one goal in the World Cup.

Japan vs Greece

The two teams had met in one previous match, in the 2005 FIFA Confederations Cup group stage, won by Japan 1–0.

Greece was reduced to ten men in the first half when Kostas Katsouranis was booked twice in eleven minutes. In the second half, Greece had a Theofanis Gekas header saved, while Japan, which needed at least a point to stay alive in the competition, had chances to score through Yoshito Ōkubo and Atsuto Uchida, but the game finished goalless. The result ensured Colombia's qualification to the knockout stage, their first since 1990.

This was the first clean sheet kept by Greece in World Cup history.

Japan vs Colombia
The two teams had met in two previous matches, most recently in a friendly in 2007, and also in the 2003 FIFA Confederations Cup group stage, won by Colombia 1–0.

Colombia took the lead mid-way through the first half, with Juan Cuadrado taking a penalty kick, shooting low down the middle after Japan centre back Yasuyuki Konno fouled Colombia striker Adrián Ramos in the box.
Japan then equalised through Shinji Okazaki's headed goal from a cross from Keisuke Honda on the right in first half stoppage time. Colombia's James Rodríguez was introduced after the half time break, and was credited for providing two assists for two goals scored by Jackson Martínez, on 55 minutes when he shot low to the net with his left foot, and 82 minutes when he curled the ball in from the right of the penalty area with his left foot, before finishing off the scoring with a strike of his own, assisted by Ramos, where he beat the last man before clipping the ball over the goalkeeper. Colombia, which had already qualified for the knockout stage and would do so as group winners if either they didn't lose this match or Ivory Coast did not beat Greece in the other match, finished as group winners with a perfect record of three wins out of three, while Japan, which had to win the match to have any chance to qualify, were eliminated.

He also set the record for the longest time between World Cup appearances as 15 years and 363 days had passed since his last versus England at the 1998 World Cup, breaking Alfred Bickel's record of 12 years and 13 days between appearances (1938–1950).

Greece vs Ivory Coast

The two teams had never met before. Greece midfielder Kostas Katsouranis (red card in previous match) and Ivory Coast defender Didier Zokora (accumulation of yellow cards) were suspended for the match.

Greece, which had to win to have any chance to qualify for the knockout stage, went in front in the 42nd minute after Cheick Tioté's defensive mistake allowed substitute Andreas Samaris to steal the ball, play a one-two with Georgios Samaras, and run in on goal before shooting past the goalkeeper with his right foot. In the second half, substitute Wilfried Bony equalised with a low right foot finish after Gervinho's pass from the left. As Japan were losing to Colombia in the other match played at the same time, Ivory Coast only required a point to qualify for the knockout stage for the first time. The game looked to be heading for a draw, until Greece won a penalty in injury time when Giovanni Sio tripped Samaras as he was about to strike the ball, and Samaras scored the penalty hitting the ball to the goalkeeper's left. The win meant Greece finished as the group runners-up, and put them into the knockout stage for the first time in its World Cup history (after unsuccessful campaigns in 1994 and 2010), while Ivory Coast were eliminated in the group stage for the third tournament in a row.

References

External links
2014 FIFA World Cup Group C, FIFA.com

Group C
Greece at the 2014 FIFA World Cup
Colombia at the 2014 FIFA World Cup
Japan at the 2014 FIFA World Cup
Ivory Coast at the 2014 FIFA World Cup